Fida, is an Arabic name given meaning redemption. It is a male given name.

People with given name Fida
Fida al-Sayed, Syrian political activist
Fida Hassnain (1924–2016), Kashmiri writer and Sufi mystic
Fida Hussein, Fiji Labour Party politician
Fida Hussain Bukhari, Pakistani religious scholar
Fida Hussain Gadi, Seraiki intellectual
Fida Hussain Malik, Pakistani general 
Fida M. Kamal, Bangladeshi lawyer
Fida Mohammad Khan (1919 – 2007), Pakistani conservative economist and lawyer

Films
Fida - Bollywood film
Fidaa - Telugu language film

Given names